"Only a God Can Save Us" refers to an interview given by Martin Heidegger to Rudolf Augstein and Georg Wolff for Der Spiegel magazine on September 23, 1966. Heidegger agreed to discuss his political past but asked for the publication to be delayed until after his death. The interview went beyond personal questions to address the general connections between philosophy, politics, and culture (as indicated by the title quote). It was published five days after Heidegger's death, on 31 May 1976. The English translation was produced by William J. Richardson.

Summary concerning Heidegger's political past
In the interview, Heidegger defended his entanglement with National Socialism in two ways: first, he argued that there was no alternative, saying that he was trying to save the university (and science in general) from being politicized and thus had to compromise with the Nazi administration. Second, he admitted that he saw an "awakening" (Aufbruch) which might help to find a "new national and social approach," but said that he changed his mind about this in 1934, largely prompted by the violence of the Night of the Long Knives.

In his interview Heidegger defended as double-speak his 1935 lecture describing the "inner truth and greatness of this movement." He affirmed that Nazi informants who observed his lectures would understand that by "movement" he meant National Socialism. However, Heidegger asserted that his dedicated students would know this statement was no apologia for the NSDAP. Rather, he meant it as he expressed it in the parenthesis that he did not read out yet claimed in the interview was present from the beginning (and included in his Introduction to Metaphysics (1953), namely, "the confrontation of planetary technology and modern humanity."

The Löwith account from 1936 has been cited to contradict the account given in the Der Spiegel interview in two ways: that he did not make any decisive break with National Socialism in 1934, and that Heidegger was willing to entertain more profound relations between his philosophy and political involvement. The Der Spiegel interviewers did not bring up Heidegger's 1949 quotation comparing the industrialization of agriculture to the extermination camps. In fact, the interviewers were not in possession of much of the evidence now known for Heidegger's Nazi sympathies.

See also
Martin Heidegger and Nazism

References

External links
English text
Martin Heidegger and Nazism,  "Only A God Can Save Us"  by Jeffrey van Davis

Works by Martin Heidegger
Interviews
Works originally published in German magazines
Der Spiegel
1966 documents
1966 in philosophy
1976 in philosophy